Trichius fasciatus, the Eurasian bee beetle, is a beetle species belonging to the family Scarabaeidae, subfamily Cetoniinae.

Varieties
 Trichius fasciatus var. dubius   Mulsant
 Trichius fasciatus var. interruptus  Mulsant

Description
These beetles are about 10 millimeters long. Head and pronotum are black, while the elytra are yellowish, crossed by a few black bands.

The first black band reaches the scutellum. The sides of the chest and the back of the abdomen are covered with a white pubescence, hence the popular name "Bee beetle" for Trichius species.

Adults can be encountered from May through July feeding on petals of a variety of flowers (Thymus, Rosa, etc.).

Distribution
This beetle is present in most of Europe and in the eastern Palearctic realm.

Gallery

External links
 Biolib
 Fauna europaea
 UKsafari

Cetoniinae
Beetles of Europe
Beetles described in 1758
Taxa named by Carl Linnaeus